Young & Beautiful is a 2013 French erotic drama film directed by François Ozon and produced by Eric and Nicolas Altmayer. The film stars Marine Vacth in the leading role of Isabelle, a teenage prostitute, and features supporting performances by Johan Leysen, Géraldine Pailhas, Frédéric Pierrot, and Charlotte Rampling. The film was nominated for the Palme d'Or at the 2013 Cannes Film Festival, and received praise from the film critics. It was shown at the 2013 Toronto International Film Festival.

Plot
While on a summer holiday with her family in the south of France, 17-year-old Isabelle decides to lose her virginity to a cute German boy named Felix. The experience leaves her unsatisfied and disassociated. Isabelle is reserved and secretive around her family, especially with her overbearing mother who thinks she knows what’s best. By autumn she is working as a prostitute. She meets clients at high-class hotels under the psuedonym Lea and lies about her age, telling her clients that she is 20 years old. Among Isabelle's clients is a 63-year-old man named Georges (Johan Leysen), whom she likes due to fact that he's kind to her. During one of their meet-ups, he dies of a heart attack while they are having sex with Isabelle on top. Isabelle tries to resuscitate him, but fails and leaves out of shock. In winter the police turn up and inform her mother, Sylvie, about Isabelle being a prostitute and Georges's death. When Isabelle arrives home, Sylvie reveals that she knows everything and flies into a rage, repeatedly slapping Isabelle before apologizing and grounding her. Sylvia and Isabelle are now estranged. Isabelle is forced to give a statement to the police. She says she was first approached by a man on the street to have sex for money, but found it disgusting. After seeing a report about students making money as prostitutes she set up a website, bought a second phone and went into business. As a minor she is the victim and will not be charged, but her mother will keep the money. Sylvia takes Isabelle to see a therapist (Serge Hefez) to help her deal with what happened, including her guilt because she thinks she killed Georges.

After Isabelle quits prostitution she lives a normal teenage life and works as a babysitter. In spring, she meets Alex at a party and they start dating. They have sex with Isabelle on top and she has to help him out. Afterwards she breaks up with Alex saying she does not love him. Isabelle reactivates her phone's SIM card and checks messages for Lea from clients. Georges's widow Alice (Charlotte Rampling) found Lea's number in her husband's address book and requested an appointment at the hotel. When she arrives, Alice explains the situation and says she wants to see the room and meet the girl Georges was with when he died. She does not blame Isabelle because she knew he saw other women, was ill and thinks dying making love is a beautiful death. They go to the room and Alice tells Isabelle to leave her clothes on and lie with her on the bed. Isabelle says she needed to come here too. Alice kindly caresses Isabelle's face; Isabelle falls asleep. She wakes up alone looking more at peace.

Cast
 Marine Vacth as Isabelle
 Johan Leysen as Georges Ferriere, Isabelle's elderly client
 Frédéric Pierrot as Patrick, Isabelle's stepfather
 Géraldine Pailhas as Sylvie, Isabelle's mother
 Jeanne Ruff as Claire, Isabelle's best friend
 Nathalie Richard as Véronique
 Charlotte Rampling as Alice Ferriere, Georges' widow
 Akéla Sari as Mouna
 Lucas Prisor as Felix, a German tourist
 Fantin Ravat as Victor, Isabelle's brother
 Laurent Delbecque as Alex, Isabelle's boyfriend
 Carole Franck as The Cop

Reception

Critical response

Upon its premiere at the 2013 Cannes Film Festival, Young & Beautiful received critical acclaim. David Rooney of The Hollywood Reporter praised Vacth's leading role and predicted that the film would "land her major exposure on the casting radar". While drawing comparisons to Ozon's 2012 film In the House Rooney wrote, "[U]nlike that playful Hitchcockian quasi-thriller, Young & Beautiful is both more carnal and more sober, suggesting the danger and fragility inherent in the central character's experimentation while keeping the dramatic intensity subdued." Leslie Felperin of Variety noted that the film was "a nuanced, emotionally temperate study of a precocious youth" and added that "its elegant execution will win warm regard [and the] subject matter should lure audiences at art houses worldwide."

Derek Malcolm of London Evening Standard wrote that Ozon was successful in "directing the slim and striking Vacth through a series of sex scenes, and also showing how the girl doesn't really know what she is doing even when pretty experienced in the art of seduction." While being appreciative of the film as a whole, Peter Bradshaw of The Guardian noted that the film was a "luxurious fantasy of a young girl's flowering: a very French and very male fantasy, like the pilot episode of the world's classiest soap opera."

Rotten Tomatoes gives the film a score of 73% based on reviews from 82 critics, with an average rating of 6.74/10. The site's consensus reads: "Ozon may not explore his themes as fully as he should, but Young & Beautiful poses enough intriguing questions -- and features a strong enough performance from Marine Vatch -- to compensate for its frustrations". On Metacritic the film has a score of 63 out of 100, based on reviews from 27 critics, indicating "generally favorable reviews".

Accolades

Music
The film takes place over the course of a year and is divided into four segments, each separated by a song of Françoise Hardy: 'L'amour d'un garçon', 'A quoi ça sert?', 'Première rencontre', and 'Je suis moi'.

References

External links
 
 
 

2013 films
2013 drama films
2010s coming-of-age drama films
2010s erotic drama films
2010s teen drama films
2010s French-language films
Films about child prostitution
Films about prostitution in Paris
Films about virginity
Films directed by François Ozon
Films set in Paris
Films shot in Paris
French coming-of-age drama films
French erotic drama films
French teen drama films
2010s French films